

Research and career
In the early 1980s, Corey worked with Nobel Prize-winning biochemist and pharmacologist Dr. Gertrude Elion to demonstrate that an antiviral that was selective and specific for a viral-specified enzyme could be safely and effectively administered to control a chronic viral infection (herpes simplex virus type 2 or HSV-2). Corey first conceived of and demonstrated the core concepts and direct line association between quantitative viral load reduction and clinical benefit using topical, intravenous and oral formulations of acyclovir in classic studies performed between 1980 and 1984. Acyclovir was the first antiviral drug to get rapid approval from the FDA, and it was Corey's studies that defined its use in genital herpes. These studies led to the licensure for acyclovir in a wide variety of infections such as HSV-1, HSV-2 and varicella chickenpox virus, including the first use of an antiviral for daily long term use. Acyclovir and its derivatives valacyclovir and famciclovir are the most prescribed antivirals in the world: over 400 million people have HSV-2 infection. These early studies prompted the subsequent successful involvement of the pharmaceutical and medical sciences communities to develop effective antiviral therapy for HIV and hepatitis B.

In 1987, Corey directed the NIH supported AIDS Clinical Trials Group (ACTG), which was established to test antivirals to HIV-1, and conducted pivotal clinical trials demonstrating the use of the antiretroviral drug AZT to reduce maternal-fetal transmission of HIV and the usefulness of combinations of antiretrovirals to prolong survival from HIV. During this time, that laboratory demonstrated that HIV circulated in plasma well before the development of AIDS. The ACTG subsequently demonstrated that the initiation of therapy early during asymptomatic stages of HIV infection reduced progression to HIV and that combinations of antiretrovirals (3>2>1 drug) were critical to the control of HIV replication and management; the result being that HIV control has enabled life expectancy to increase globally. Triple combination therapy with two nucleosides and a protease inhibitor demonstrated a marked reduction in viral load, increase in CD4+ T-cell count and lowering of activation markers with the addition of the protease inhibitor. The ACTG was the first to lead the integration of community members into clinical research activities.

In the mid-1990s, Corey increasingly focused his work in the area of vaccine development, and in 1998 worked with the US National Institute of Allergy and Infectious Diseases to develop a global clinical trials group to speed the development of HIV vaccines. In 2002, Corey became the major driver in conceiving of the Global HIV Vaccine Enterprise. The Enterprise is one of the few scientific programs that is overseen by leaders of the major industrialized countries of the world.

One of Corey's major scientific initiatives has been to study and develop better therapy for the treatment and prevention of infectious disease associated cancers such as Kaposi sarcoma and Burkitt lymphoma. In the mid-2000s, Corey launched a partnership between Fred Hutchinson Cancer Research Center and the Uganda Cancer Institute. On July 30, 2010, Dr. Corey was named the fourth president of the Fred Hutchinson Cancer Research Center. One of his major initiatives was to increase the strength of the Fred Hutch's translational research programs and its commitment to bring better therapies and preventions for cancer to the developing world. In May 2015, the Fred Hutch/UCI partnership led to the opening of the first comprehensive cancer center jointly constructed by US and African institutions in sub-Saharan Africa: the UCI-Fred Hutch Cancer Centre. In 2013, as an outgrowth of his work in T-cell immunology, Corey became a cofounder of Juno Therapeutics, a company devoted to using genetically engineered T cells to fight cancer.
 
Corey's early research dealt with herpes simplex viruses, and he headed several landmark studies defining the disease and leading the licensure of acyclovir and valacyclovir for its treatment. This included a study to reduce acquisition among sexual partners. Between 1988 and 1998, Corey published a series of key studies showing the association between infection with HSV-2 and HIV-1. These studies led to pilot and large sale clinical trials of anti-HSV-2 therapy to reduce HIV acquisition and transmission. In 2000, Corey conducted the first discordant couple study using antiviral therapy for HSV-2. His publication in 2004 on reduction of transmission of HSV-2 was the first to demonstrate that antivirals could reduce transmission of infections to others (treatment as prevention), a concept subsequently utilized by the HPTN 052 protocol team using continuous ART to reduce transmission of HIV to discordant couples. This latter approach is one of the current cornerstones of public health practices for reducing the morbidity and potentially the transmission of HIV-I.

More recently, his research group has shown the importance of the mucosal immune system in controlling HSV reactivation, leading to current momentum to try to develop novel vaccines for treating genital herpes. Previously, the scientific consensus for HSV-2 pathogenesis was that virus reactivation was infrequent and determined by virus-neuronal interactions at the ganglion level and that most reactivations resulted in genital lesions.

Corey has been a central figure in the field of HIV vaccine development. The HIV Vaccine Trials Network (HVTN) now includes investigators on five continents spanning more than 30 cities and is leading the research for phase 1–3 clinical trials of candidate HIV vaccines globally. The HVTN as of 2018 is conducting 4 large scale efficacy trials in North America, South America and several countries in sub-Saharan Africa. On Dec. 1, 2015 the work of Corey and HTVN scientists pursuing a vaccine to potentially halt HIV and AIDS was highlighted in an HBO/VICE special report titled "Countdown to Zero."

Honors
Corey was a member of the editorial board of the New England Journal of Medicine. He is a fellow of the Infectious Diseases Society of America and a member of the American Epidemiological Society, American Society for Clinical Investigation, and the Association of American Physicians. In addition, he is the recipient of the Pan American Society's Clinical Virology Award, the American Sexually Transmitted Diseases Association's Parran Award, and the University of Michigan Medical School's Distinguished Alumnus Award. In 2008, he was elected to the National Academy of Medicine and in 2012 elected a Member of the American Academy of Arts and Sciences. He has published over 900 scientific publications and editorials (as of 2018).

Selected works

 Corey L, Fife KH, Benedetti JK, Winter C, Fahnlander A, Connor JD, Hintz MA, Holmes KK. Intravenous acyclovir for the treatment of primary genital herpes. Ann Intern Med. 1983 Jun;98(6):914-21.
 Coombs RW, Collier AC, Allain J-P, Nikora B, Leuther M, Gjerset GF, Corey L. Plasma viremia in human immunodeficiency virus infection. N Engl J Med. 1989 Dec 14;321(24):1626-31.
 Volberding PA, Lagakos SW, Koch MA, Petinelli C, Myers MW, Booth DK, Balfour HH, Reichman RC, Bartlett JA, Hirsch MS, Murphy RL, Hardy WD, Soeiro R, Fischl MA, Bartlett JG, Merigan TC, Hyslop NE, Richman DD, Valentine FT, Corey L, and the ACTG. Zidovudine in Asymptomatic Human Immunodeficiency Virus Infection — A Controlled Trial in Persons with Fewer Than 500 CD4-Positive Cells per Cubic Millimeter. N Engl J Med. 1990 Apr 5;322(14):941-9.
 Cooney EL, McElrath MJ, Corey L, Hu SL, Collier A, Arditti D, Hoffman M, Coombs RW, Smith GE, Greenberg PD. Enhanced immunity to HIV envelope elicited by a combined vaccine regimen consisting of priming with a vaccinia recombinant expressing HIV envelope and boosting with gp160 protein. Proc Natl Acad Sci USA. 1993 Mar 1;90(5):1882–1886.
 Schacker T, Collier ACC, Hughes J, Shea T, Corey L. The clinical and epidemiological features of primary HIV infection. Ann Intern Med. 1996 Aug 15;125(4):257-64.
 Chun TW, Engel D, Berrey MM, Shea T, Corey L, Fauci AS. Early establishment of a pool of latently infected, resting CD4+ T cells during primary HIV-1 infection. Proc Natl Acad Sci USA. 1998 Jul 21;95(15):8869-73.
 Wald A, Zeh J, Selke S, Warren T, Ryncarz AJ, Ashley R, Krieger JN, Corey L. Reactivation of genital herpes simplex virus type 2 infection in asymptomatic seropositive persons. N Engl J Med. 2000 Mar 23;342(12):844-50.
 Wald A, Langenberg AGM, Link K, Izu A, Ashley R, Warren T, Tyring S, Douglas JM, Corey L. Effect of condoms on reducing the transmission of herpes simplex virus type-2 from men to women. JAMA. 2001 Jun 27;285(24):3100-6.
 Klausner RD, Fauci AS, Corey L, Nabel GJ, Gayle H, Berkley S, Haynes BF, Baltimore D, Collins C, Douglas RG, Esparza J, Francis DP, Ganguly NK, Gerberding JL, Johnston MI, Kazatchkine MD, McMichael AJ, Makgoba MW, Pantaleo G, Piot P, Shao Y, Tramont E, Varmus H, Wasserheit JN. The need for a global HIV vaccine enterprise. Science. 2003 Jun 27;300(5628):2036–2039.
 Corey L, Wald A, Celum C, Quinn TC. The effects of herpes simplex virus-2 on HIV-1 acquisition and transmission: a review of two overlapping epidemics. J Acquir Immune Defic Syndr. 2004 Apr 15;35(5):435-45.
 Zerr DM, Meier AS, Selke SS, Frenkel LM, Huang ML, Wald A, Rhoads M, Nguy L, Bornemann R, Morrow RA, Corey L. A population-based study of primary human herpesvirus 6 infection. N Engl J Med. 2005 Feb 24;352(8):768-76.
 Zhu J, Hladik F, Woodward A, Klock A, Peng T, Johnston C, Remington M, Magaret A, Koelle DM, Wald A, Corey L. Persistence of HIV-1 receptor-positive cells after HSV-2 reactivation is a potential mechanism for increased HIV-1 acquisition. Nat Med. 2009 Aug;15(8):886-92. PMC 2723183
 Schiffer JT, Abu-Raddad L, Mark KE, Zhu J, Selke S, Koelle DM, Wald A, Corey L. Mucosal host immune response predicts the severity and duration of herpes simplex virus-2 genital tract shedding episodes. Proc Natl Acad Sci U S A. 2010 Nov 2;107(44):18973-8. PMC 2973882
 Corey L, McElrath MJ. HIV vaccines: mosaic approach to virus diversity. Nat Med. 2010 Mar;16(3):268-70.
Chapuis A, Casper C, Kuntz S, Zhu J, Tjernlund A, Diem K, Turtle C, Cigal M, Velez R, Riddell SR, Corey L, Greenberg PD. HIV-specific CD8+ T-cells from HIV+ individuals receiving HAART can be expanded ex vivo to augment systemic and mucosal immunity in vivo. Blood. 2011 May 19;117(20):5391-5402. PMC 3109713

 Zhu J, Peng T, Johnston C, Phasouk K, Kask AS, Klock A, Jin L, Diem K, Koelle DM, Wald A, Robins H, Corey L. Immune surveillance by CD8αα+ skin-resident T cells in human herpes virus infection. Nature. 2013 May 23;497(7450):494-7. PMC 3663925
 Hammer SM, Sobieszczyk ME, Janes H, Karuna ST, Mulligan MJ, Grove D, Koblin BA, Buchbinder SP, Keefer MC, Tomaras GD, Frahm N, Hural J, Anude C, Graham BS, Enama ME, Adams E, Dejesus E, Novak RM, Frank I, Bentley C, Ramirez S, Fu R, Koup RA, Mascola JR, Nabel GJ, Montefiori DC, Kublin J, McElrath MJ, Corey L, Gilbert PB; the HVTN 505 Study Team. Efficacy Trial of a DNA/rAd5 HIV-1 Preventive Vaccine. N Engl J Med. 2013 Nov 28;369(22):2083-92.
 Johnston C, Zhu J, Jing L, Laing K, McClurkan C, Klock A, Diem K, Stanaway J, Tronstein E, Kwok WW, Huang ML, Selke S, Fong Y, Magaret A, Koelle DM, Wald A, and Corey L. Virologic and immunologic evidence of multifocal genital herpes simplex virus type 2 infection. J. Virol. 2014 May;88(9):4921-31.
 Wald A, Corey L, Timmler B, Magaret A, Warren T, Tyring S, Johnston C, Kriesel J, Fife K, Galitz L, Stoelben S, Huang M-L, Selke S, Stobernack H-P, Ruebsamen-Schaeff H and Birkmann A. Helicase-Primase Inhibitor Pritelivir for HSV-2 infection. N Eng J Med 2014 Jan 16;370(3):201-10.
 Jin X, Morgan C, Yu X, DeRosa S, Tomaras GD, Montefiori DC, Kublin J, Corey L, Keefer MC; NIAID HIV Vaccine Trials Network. Multiple factors affect immunogenicity of DNA plasmid HIV vaccines in human clinical trials. Vaccine. 2015 May 11;33(20):2347-53.
 Diem K, Magaret A, Klock A, Jin L, Zhu J, Corey L. Image analysis for accurately counting CD4+ and CD8+ T cells in human tissue. J Virol Methods. 2015 Sep 15;222:117-21.
 Janes H, Herbeck JT, Tovanabutra S, Thomas R, Frahm N, Duerr A, Hural J, Corey L, Self SG, Buchbinder SP et al. HIV-1 infections with multiple founders are associated with higher viral loads than infections with single founders. Nat Med. 2015 Oct;21(10):1139-41.
 Dimitrov D, Kublin JG, Ramsey S and Corey L. Are clade specific HIV vaccines a necessity? An analysis based on mathematical models. EBioMedicine. 2015 Dec;2(12):2062-2069.
 Tjernlund A, Burgener A, Lindvall JM, Peng T, Zhu J, Öhrmalm L, Picker LJ, Broliden K, McElrath MJ, Corey L. In Situ Staining and Laser Capture Microdissection of Lymph Node Residing SIV Gag-Specific CD8+ T cells-A Tool to Interrogate a Functional Immune Response Ex Vivo. PLoS One. 2016 Mar 17;11(3):e0149907. PMC4795610
 Joshua T Schiffer; David A Swan; Amalia Magaret; Anna Wald; Lawrence Corey. Mathematical Modeling Predicts that Increased HSV-2 Shedding in HIV-1 Infected Persons is Due to Poor Immunologic Control in Both Ganglia and Genital Mucosa. PLOS One. 2016 Jun 10;11(6):e0155124.
 Churchyard G, Mlisana K, Karuna S, Williamson AL, Williamson C, Morris L, Tomaras GD, De Rosa SC, Gilbert PB, Gu N, Yu C, Mkhize NN, Hermanus T, Allen M, Pensiero M, Barnett SW, Gray G, Bekker LG, Montefiori DC, Kublin J, Corey L. Sequential Immunization with gp140 Boosts Immune Responses Primed by Modified Vaccinia Ankara or DNA in HIV-Uninfected South African Participants. PLoS One. 2016 Sep 1;11(9):e0161753.
 Huang Y, Zhang L, Ledgerwood J, Grunenberg N, Bailer R, Isaacs A, Seaton K, Mayer KH, Capparelli E, Corey L, Gilbert PB. Population pharmacokinetics analysis of VRC01, an HIV-1 broadly neutralizing monoclonal antibody, in healthy adults. MAbs. 2017 Jul;9(5):792-800.

References

External links
Lawrence Corey, Official web page as Principal Investigator of the HIV Vaccine Trials Network
Official web page at the  Fred Hutchinson Cancer Research Center

American immunologists
American virologists
HIV/AIDS researchers
1947 births
Living people
Fellows of the American Academy of Arts and Sciences
University of Michigan Medical School alumni
20th-century American scientists
21st-century American scientists
University of Washington faculty
Members of the National Academy of Medicine